General elections were held in the Faroe Islands on 8 November 1958. The Social Democratic Party emerged as the largest party in the Løgting, winning 8 of the 30 seats.

Results

References

Faroe Islands
General election
Elections in the Faroe Islands
Faroese general election
Election and referendum articles with incomplete results